Neil Smillie (born 19 July 1958) is an English former professional football player and manager. He played for a number of clubs, with the high point of his career being an appearance in the 1983 FA Cup Final for Brighton & Hove Albion.

Playing career
The son of the former Barnsley and Lincoln City player Ron Smillie, Neil Smillie was born in Barnsley. He began his career with Crystal Palace, where he spent seven years, during which he had a spell on loan at Brentford and also spent two summers playing for Memphis Rogues in the North American Soccer League. In 1982, he was sold to Brighton & Hove Albion. During his time with that club, he played in the 1983 FA Cup Final, in which Brighton held Manchester United to a 2–2 draw before losing in a replay.

In 1985, Smillie moved to Watford for a fee of £100,000 but his spell at Vicarage Road was unsuccessful, with only 16 first-team appearances in three years. In 1988, he moved on to Reading. A year later, he moved again to Brentford, where he was a first-team regular for five years with over 170 appearances.

Managerial career
In 1993, the new Gillingham manager Mike Flanagan made Smillie his first signing, appointing him as player-coach. Gillingham went into administration in 1995 and the receivers dismissed Flanagan as manager, appointing Smillie as manager for the remainder of the season.

When new owners took over Gillingham in summer 1995, Smillie moved to Wycombe Wanderers, where he served as youth team coach. He had a brief spell as caretaker manager in 1996 and, in 1998, gained the job on a permanent basis. He was sacked the following year.

Personal life 
As of July 2010, Smillie was working as Sports Marketing Manager for Nike UK and headed the company's talent ID scheme.

References

1958 births
Living people
English footballers
English Football League players
North American Soccer League (1968–1984) players
Crystal Palace F.C. players
Brentford F.C. players
Memphis Rogues players
Brighton & Hove Albion F.C. players
Watford F.C. players
Reading F.C. players
Gillingham F.C. players
English football managers
Gillingham F.C. managers
Wycombe Wanderers F.C. managers
Footballers from Barnsley
English expatriate footballers
Expatriate soccer players in the United States
Association football midfielders
English expatriate sportspeople in the United States
FA Cup Final players